The 1974–75 Bundesliga was the 12th season of the Bundesliga, West Germany's premier football league. It began on 24 August 1974 and ended on 14 June 1975. FC Bayern Munich were the defending champions.

Competition modus
Every team played two games against each other team, one at home and one away. Teams received two points for a win and one point for a draw. If two or more teams were tied on points, places were determined by goal difference and, if still tied, by goals scored. The team with the most points were crowned champions while the three teams with the fewest points were relegated to their respective 2. Bundesliga divisions.

Team changes to 1973–74
Fortuna Köln and Hannover 96 were relegated to the newly introduced 2. Bundesliga after finishing in the last two places. Both teams were replaced by Tennis Borussia Berlin and Eintracht Braunschweig, who won their respective promotion play-off groups.

Season overview

Team overview

League table

Results

Top goalscorers
27 goals
  Jupp Heynckes (Borussia Mönchengladbach)

24 goals
  Dieter Müller (1. FC Köln)

23 goals
  Gerd Müller (FC Bayern Munich)

21 goals
  Roland Sandberg (1. FC Kaiserslautern)

18 goals
  Allan Simonsen (Borussia Mönchengladbach)
  Erwin Kostedde (Kickers Offenbach)
  Manfred Burgsmüller (Rot-Weiss Essen)

17 goals
  Klaus Fischer (FC Schalke 04)
  Hermann Ohlicher (VfB Stuttgart)

16 goals
  Bernd Hölzenbein (Eintracht Frankfurt)

Champion squad

References

External links
 DFB Bundesliga archive 1974/1975

Bundesliga seasons
1
Germany